Home Lake is a lake in Norman County, in the U.S. state of Minnesota.

Home Lake derives its name from the surname of John Homelvig, a county official.

References

Lakes of Minnesota
Lakes of Norman County, Minnesota